Kenneth Storvik (born 27 February 1972) is a former football midfielder.

Career
Hailing from Bergen, he started his career in 1991 with Åsane, then moved to Viking and had a spell with Lyngby in 1996. In 1997 moved abroad to Sweden, playing for the club Helsingborg. In 2000, he moved back to Norway and played for Rosenborg, however he only made 5 appearances. In 2003, he spent a season with Brann and in 2004 he played for Danish side Frem.

Honours
Norwegian Premier League winner: 1991

References
Rosenborg Web - Former player: Kenneth Storvik
Kenneth Storvik Boldklubben Frem profile and record 
VG Nett - Kenneth Storvik

Norwegian footballers
Åsane Fotball players
Viking FK players
Rosenborg BK players
Helsingborgs IF players
SK Brann players
Boldklubben Frem players
Footballers from Bergen
Norwegian expatriate footballers
Expatriate men's footballers in Denmark
Expatriate footballers in Sweden
Eliteserien players
Allsvenskan players
1972 births
Living people
Association football midfielders